| highest attendance  = 17,815Leicester v Worcester3 November 2018
| lowest attendance   = 3,824Sale v Newcastle3 February 2019
| tries               = {{#expr:
 5 + 3 + 5 + 5 + 11 + 6 
 + 6 + 4 + 4 + 7 + 4 + 4
 + 4 + 6 + 3 + 10 + 4 + 4
 + 3 + 6 + 9 + 7 + 6 + 7
 + 7 + 14
 + 3
}}
| top point scorer    = James Grayson (Northampton)62 points
| top try scorer      = Zach Kibirige (Newcastle)5 tries
| venue               = 
| attendance2         = 
| champions           = Northampton Saints
| count               = 1
| runner-up           = Saracens
| website             = https://www.premiershiprugby.com/
| previous year       = 2017–18 (Anglo-Welsh)
| previous tournament = 2017–18 Anglo-Welsh Cup
| next year           = 2019–20
| next tournament     = 2019–20 Premiership Rugby Cup
}}

The 2018–19 Premiership Rugby Cup was the 47th season of England's national rugby union cup competition and the first under the new Premiership Rugby Cup format following the disbanding of the Anglo-Welsh Cup at the end of the 2017–18 season due to the withdrawal of the Welsh Pro14 regions.  Although there are no stipulations on player selection, the cup was seen by many clubs as a development competition, and games took place during the Autumn International window and during the Six Nations.

Northampton Saints became the first ever winners of the Premiership Cup when they defeated Saracens 23 – 9 in the final at Franklin's Gardens on 17 March 2019.  It was the Saints' first domestic cup triumph since winning the 2009–10 LV Cup and their second overall.

Competition format

The competition consists of the twelve English Premiership teams arranged in three pools of four clubs each, with each team playing three games against teams in their pool, as well as a 'derby' game against a team in another group.  The top team in each pool, plus the best overall runner up, progress to the semi-finals, with the highest ranked teams having home advantage.  The winners of the semi-finals then meet at the final in March 2019 to be held at the home ground of the highest ranked remaining team.

Teams and locations

Pool stage

Pool 1

Round 1

Round 2

Round 3

Pool 2

Round 1

Round 2

Round 3

Pool 3

Round 1

Round 2

Round 3

Round 4 (derby games)
After three pool games, each team will play a 'derby' game against a team in another pool, with results counting towards the final standings in each pool.

Game originally due to be played on 2 February but postponed twice due to snow.

Knock-out stage

The four qualifiers are seeded according to performance in the pool stage. The top 2 seeds host the semi-finals against the lower seeds, in a 1 v 4, 2v 3 format.  Note, if two teams qualify from the same pool, they can still be drawn together in the semi-finals.

Teams are ranked by:
1 – competition points (4 for a win, 2 for a draw)
2 – where competition points are equal, greatest number of wins
3 – where the number of wins are equal, aggregate points difference
4 – where the aggregate points difference are equal, greatest number of points scored
5 – where the greatest number of points are equal, greatest number of tries scored

Semi-finals

Final

Attendances

Individual statistics
 Points scorers includes tries as well as conversions, penalties and drop goals. Appearance figures also include coming on as substitutes (unused substitutes not included).

Top points scorers

Top try scorers

Season records

Team
Largest home win — 52 points
52 – 0 Bath at home to Gloucester on 4 February 2019
Largest away win — 20 points
32 – 12 Saracens away to Harlequins on 26 January 2019
Most points scored — 59
59 – 33 Northampton Saints at home to Newcastle Falcons on 9 February 2019
Most tries in a match — 9
Northampton Saints at home to Newcastle Falcons on 9 February 2019
Most conversions in a match — 7 (2)
Bath at home to Gloucester on 4 February 2019
Northampton Saints at home to Newcastle Falcons on 9 February 2019
Most penalties in a match — 4 (4)
Harlequins away to Bath on 27 October 2018
Saracens at home to Leicester Tigers on 27 October 2018
Wasps at home to Bristol Bears on 11 November 2018
Saracens away to Worcester Warriors on 8 February 2019
Most drop goals in a match — 0

Player
Most points in a match — 20
 Semesa Rokoduguni for Bath at home to Gloucester on 4 February 2019
Most tries in a match — 4
 Semesa Rokoduguni for Bath at home to Gloucester on 4 February 2019
Most conversions in a match — 7
 James Grayson for Northampton Saints at home to Newcastle Falcons on 9 February 2019
Most penalties in a match — 4 (4)
 Demetri Catrakilis for Harlequins away to Bath on 27 October 2018
 Max Malins for Saracens at home to Leicester Tigers on 27 October 2018
 Lima Sopoaga for Wasps at home to Bristol Bears on 11 November 2018
 Alex Lozowski for Saracens away to Worcester Warriors on 8 February 2019
Most drop goals in a match — 0

Attendances
Highest — 17,815
Leicester Tigers at home to Worcester Warriors on 3 November 2018
Lowest — 3,824
Sale Sharks at home to Newcastle Falcons on 3 February 2019

Notes

See also
 Premiership Rugby
 Anglo-Welsh Cup
 2018–19 RFU Championship Cup
 English rugby union system
 List of English rugby union teams
 Rugby union in England

References

External links
 Premiership Rugby

Rugby union competitions in England
2018–19 rugby union tournaments for clubs
Premiership Rugby Cup